Valentin Konstantinovich Chernykh (12 March 1935 – 6 August 2012) was a Soviet and Russian screenwriter, playwright and director. He wrote for more than 35 films between 1972 and 2011. He was the Head of the Jury at the 27th Moscow International Film Festival.

Filmography
 A Man at His Place (1972)
Earthly Love (1974)
 Moscow Does Not Believe in Tears (1979)
Taste of Bread (1979)
To Marry a Captain (1985)
Team 33 (1987)
 Love with Privileges (1989)
I Declare War on You (1990)
Tests for Real Men (1998)
 Women's Property (1999)
Children of the Arbat (2004)
 Our Own (2004)
 Brezhnev (2005)

Honors and awards 

 USSR State Prize (1980) – for screenplay to the multiple-part film Taste of Bread (1979)
 Honored Art Worker of the RSFSR (1980)
 Order of the Red Banner of Labour (1985) – for services in development of the Soviet cinema and in connection with 50th birthday
 Order of Friendship (2010) – for services in development of national culture and art, many years of fruitful work

References

External links

1935 births
2012 deaths
20th-century Russian dramatists and playwrights
20th-century Russian male writers
20th-century Russian screenwriters
21st-century Russian dramatists and playwrights
21st-century Russian male writers
21st-century Russian screenwriters
People from Pskov
Recipients of the Nika Award
Recipients of the Order of the Red Banner of Labour
Recipients of the USSR State Prize
Male screenwriters
Socialist realism writers
Russian dramatists and playwrights
Russian film directors
Russian male writers
Soviet dramatists and playwrights
Soviet film directors
Soviet male writers
Soviet screenwriters

Burials at Vagankovo Cemetery